Rebecca Beth Bauer-Kahan (née Bauer; born October 28, 1978), also known by her initials RBK, is an American attorney and politician who has served as a member of the California State Assembly from the 16th district since 2018. A member of the Democratic Party, her district extends from Lamorinda to the Tri-Valley region of the San Francisco Bay Area.

Early life and education 

Bauer-Kahan was born Rebecca Beth Bauer in Portola Valley, California, on October 28, 1978. She is Jewish. Her grandparents came to the United States as refugees in 1939 after fleeing Austria to escape the Holocaust.

Bauer-Kahan spent her childhood in the Bay Area and attended Bay Area public schools. In 2000, she graduated from the University of Pennsylvania with a bachelor of arts in psychology. She then enrolled at Georgetown University and graduated with a juris doctor in 2004.

Early career 

Bauer-Kahan practiced law in Washington, D.C. before returning to the Bay Area in 2005. As an attorney specializing in environmental law, she led internal investigations into corporations to improve their environmental practices and worked with tech companies on intellectual property cases. She was also an immigration attorney for the International Refugee Assistance Project, and on their behalf in 2017, she coordinated legal services at San Francisco International Airport to assist refugees and immigrants impacted by the Trump administration’s travel ban.

In 2010, Bauer-Kahan became a law professor at Santa Clara University, teaching appellate law and legal research and writing. She joined the faculty of Golden Gate University as a law professor in 2014. She decided to enter politics following the 2016 presidential election.

California State Assembly

Tenure 

Bauer-Kahan was first elected to the California State Assembly in 2018, narrowly defeating Republican incumbent Catharine Baker.

Soon after being sworn in, Bauer-Kahan ascended to a leadership role, becoming assistant speaker pro tempore of the Assembly; she left her leadership role after one term. She also founded the Select Committee on Reproductive Health—the first committee of its kind in the nation—during her first term.

To date, Bauer-Kahan has authored 16 pieces of legislation that have been signed into law. Her legislation covers a variety of topics, such as gun control, food safety, reproductive rights, and environmental protection. Her signature piece of legislation is AB 1666, which protects abortion providers from civil liability and was signed into law by Gavin Newsom on the day Roe v. Wade was overturned. She also serves on 12 committees and currently chairs the Water, Parks, and Wildlife Committee and the Select Committee on Reproductive Health.

Committees 

 Committee on Water, Parks, and Wildlife (chair)
 Committee on Banking and Finance
 Committee on Environmental Safety and Toxic Materials
 Committee on Privacy and Consumer Protection
 Committee on Utilities and Energy
 Select Committee on Reproductive Health (chair)
 Select Committee on California's Clean Energy Economy
 Select Committee on Cybersecurity
 Select Committee on Domestic Violence
 Select Committee on Impact Investing for Improved Social and Environmental Outcomes
 Select Committee on the Nonprofit Sector
 Select Committee on Uplifting Girls and Women of Color in California

Caucus memberships 

 Bay Area Caucus
 California Legislative Environmental Caucus
 California Legislative Jewish Caucus
 California Legislative Women's Caucus

Elections

2018

2020

2022

Personal life 

Bauer-Kahan married her husband, Darren Kahan, in 2007. When they married, both took the surname Bauer-Kahan.

They have three children together and live in Orinda, California.

References

External links
 Campaign website
 Government website

1978 births
21st-century American politicians
21st-century American women politicians
California lawyers
Georgetown University Law Center alumni
Golden Gate University faculty
Living people
Democratic Party members of the California State Assembly
People from Santa Clara County, California
University of Pennsylvania School of Arts and Sciences alumni
Women state legislators in California